The Illinois Observing Nanosatellite (ION) is the first CubeSat mission developed by the students of University of Illinois at Urbana-Champaign. The satellite was lost in the failure of the Dnepr launch on 26 July 2006.
Completed in April 2005 as a part of the Illinois Tiny Satellite Initiative, the satellite took almost four years to be designed, built and tested by an interdisciplinary team of student engineers. The payloads included a photometer, a micro-thruster and a camera.

Mission objectives 
The science and technology objectives of the ION-1 mission were aimed at advancing key enabling technologies for CubeSats:

Measurement of oxygen intensity in Earth's ionosphere to understand how energy transfers occur across large regions
Test the MicroVacuum Arc Thruster (µVAT), a versatile small satellite propulsion technology for lateral movement and fine-control of attitude
Test the SID processor board designed specifically for small satellites in low Earth orbit (LEO)
Test a small CMOS camera for Earth imaging
Demonstrate attitude stabilization on a CubeSat

Future missions at UIUC 
ION-1 was built using the IlliniSat-1 bus. The upgraded IlliniSat-2 bus is now under development for missions such as Lower Atmosphere Ionosphere Coupling Experiment (LAICE) and the CubeSail, both to be launched in 2016.

References

CubeSats
Satellite launch failures
Spacecraft launched in 2006
Student satellites
Space accidents and incidents in Kazakhstan